Stare Krasewicze  is a village in the administrative district of Gmina Siemiatycze, within Siemiatycze County, Podlaskie Voivodeship, in north-eastern Poland.

The village has a population of 60.

References

Stare Krasewicze